The British Virgin Islands competed at the 2014 Summer Youth Olympics held in Nanjing, China from 16 August to 28 August 2014.

Athletics

British Virgin Islands qualified six athletes.

Qualification Legend: Q=Final A (medal); qB=Final B (non-medal); qC=Final C (non-medal); qD=Final D (non-medal); qE=Final E (non-medal)

Boys
Track & road events

Field Events

Girls
Track & road events

Field events

Sailing

British Virgin Islands qualified one boat based on its performance at the Byte CII North American & Caribbean Continental Qualifiers.

Swimming

British Virgin Islands qualified one swimmer.

Girls

References

2014 in British Virgin Islands sport
Nations at the 2014 Summer Youth Olympics
British Virgin Islands at the Youth Olympics